Aleksandr Mikhailovich Denisov (born 23 February 1989) is a Russian footballer. He plays as a centre-back.

Club career
He made his debut in the Russian Premier League for FC Dynamo Moscow on 20 July 2008 in a game against FC Luch-Energiya Vladivostok.

International career
Denisov was a part of the Russia U-21 side that was competing in the 2011 European Under-21 Championship qualification.

Career statistics

Club

Notes

References

External links
 

1989 births
Sportspeople from Tula, Russia
Living people
Russian footballers
Russia youth international footballers
Russia under-21 international footballers
Association football midfielders
FC Dynamo Moscow players
FC Salyut Belgorod players
FC Fakel Voronezh players
FC Arsenal Tula players
FC Volgar Astrakhan players
FC Neftekhimik Nizhnekamsk players
FC Dynamo Bryansk players
FC Tambov players
FC SKA-Khabarovsk players
FC KAMAZ Naberezhnye Chelny players
Russian Premier League players
Russian First League players
Russian Second League players